The 1994 NBA draft took place on June 29, 1994, at Hoosier Dome in Indianapolis. Two NBA rookies of the year were picked in the first round, as Jason Kidd and Grant Hill were co-winners of the award for the 1994–95 NBA season. Kidd and Hill would end up as perennial All-Stars (10 and 7-time selections, respectively), though Hill's career was marred by severe injuries.

The first overall pick Glenn Robinson was involved in a contract holdout shortly after being selected, reportedly seeking a 13-year, $100 million contract. Both Robinson and the Milwaukee Bucks eventually agreed on a 10-year, $68 million contract, which once stood as the richest contract ever signed by a rookie in professional sports. A fixed salary cap for rookies was implemented by the NBA the following season. Robinson himself had a productive NBA career, becoming a two-time NBA All-Star and winning an NBA Championship in 2005 in his final year with the San Antonio Spurs.

Notably, this is the final draft to date to see all of the first three picks make All-Star rosters with the teams that originally drafted them.

Draft selections

Notable undrafted players
These players went undrafted in 1994 but played in the NBA.

Early entrants

College underclassmen
The following college basketball players successfully applied for early draft entrance.

  Maurice Barnett – C, Elizabeth City State (junior)
  Jamie Brandon – G, LSU (junior)
  Charles Claxton – C, Georgia (junior)
  Rennie Clemons – G, Illinois (junior)
  Sedric Curry – F, North Dakota (junior)
  Yinka Dare – C, George Washington (sophomore)
  Thomas Hamilton – C, Wabash Valley (freshman)
  Lemon Haynes – F, Augusta (junior)
  Juwan Howard – F, Michigan (junior)
  Jason Kidd – G, California (sophomore)
  Voshon Lenard – G, Minnesota (junior)
  Donyell Marshall – F, Connecticut (junior)
  Lamond Murray – F, California (junior)
  Glenn Robinson – F, Purdue (junior)
  Jalen Rose – G/F, Michigan (junior)
  Clifford Rozier – F, Louisville (junior)
  Johnny Tyson – C, Central Oklahoma (junior)
  Dontonio Wingfield – F, Cincinnati (freshman)

Other eligible players

See also
 List of first overall NBA draft picks

References

External links
 1994 NBA Draft

Draft
National Basketball Association draft
NBA draft
NBA draft
1990s in Indianapolis
Basketball in Indianapolis
Events in Indianapolis